Pseudoscilla bilirata is a species of sea snail, a marine gastropod mollusk in the family Pyramidellidae, the pyrams and their allies.

Description
The length of the shell varies between 1.5 mm and 2 mm. Like most Pyramidellidae, the shell is white. Protruding dextral ridges spiral up the shell's opening to the tip. The opening lip of the shell is ridged.

Distribution
This marine species occurs on the Atlantic coast of Africa, from Morocco in the north to Angola in the south. It also occurs on the Canary Islands, Madeira and the Savage Islands, but it does not occur in Cape Verde and São Tomé and Príncipe.

References

External links
 To Biodiversity Heritage Library (1 publication)
 To CLEMAM
 To Encyclopedia of Life
 

Pyramidellidae
Gastropods described in 1870
Molluscs of the Atlantic Ocean
Gastropods of Africa
Molluscs of the Canary Islands
Molluscs of Madeira